Sabaskong Bay 35C is a First Nations reserve on Lake of the Woods in northwestern Ontario. It is one of the reserves of the Ojibways of Onigaming First Nation.

References

Saulteaux reserves in Ontario
Communities in Kenora District
Communities in Rainy River District